BizWest is a print and electronic business paper in Northern Colorado.

History 
In 2010, Brown Publishing Company, the owner of the newspapers Boulder County Business Report and Northern Colorado Business Report declared bankruptcy and, in September, sold them to Ohio Community Media. In February 2011, the publishers of the two papers formed BizWest Media to acquire their publications, the Wyoming Business Report, and ancillary other assets from Ohio Community Media. In March 2014, the Boulder County Business Report and Northern Colorado Business Report were merged into a biweekly printed paper called BizWest, with initial circulation of 9,000 to cover Boulder, Broomfield, Larimer and Weld counties, as well as the Denver-Boulder corridor.

In September 2016, BizWest reduced its print publication frequency to monthly and laid off four of its eighteen staff, including one writer. The company cited subscribers shifting to digital-only subscriptions and management's desire to focus on growth areas of the business as reasons for the changes.

References

External links 
 BizWest website

Business newspapers published in the United States
Newspapers published in Colorado
Publications established in 2014
2014 establishments in Colorado
Monthly newspapers
Companies based in Boulder, Colorado